Tiamat's Wrath is a science fiction novel by James S. A. Corey, the pen name of Daniel Abraham and Ty Franck, and the eighth book in their series The Expanse. Following the series' tradition of referring to ancient mythology in its titles, the book's title references the Babylonian goddess Tiamat, who took part in the creation of the universe.

Plot summary 

Following the events of Persepolis Rising, James Holden is a captive on Laconia, allowed to roam the grounds of High Consul Winston Duarte’s palace but with little other freedom. He pays his respects to Chrisjen Avasarala, who died four months previously, and talks with her granddaughter and Camina Drummer, former president of the defunct Transport Union.

Through another of the Ring gates, Elvi Okoye, her husband Fayez and several other scientists are sent on a Laconian mission to the “dead worlds”, systems past the ring gates which have no habitable worlds. They find a planet-size green diamond which interacts strangely with their sample of active protomolecule but are forced by the commander to move on to the next system before they can adequately probe it. They arrive to find a neutron star pushed to the edge of the Tolman-Oppenheimer-Volkov limit, with no other matter in the area. The Laconian commander reveals their plan to send an antimatter-laden ship through the ring gates to attack the creatures which have been seen “eating” ships.

In the Sol system, Naomi, working for the underground resistance against Laconia, arrives on a station in the Outer Planets to talk with Bobbie and Alex, operating their stolen Laconian gunship Gathering Storm before leaving again. Bobbie and Alex embark on a mission to capture a Laconian freighter carrying supplies and a high-ranking political officer but the officer and their own spies are caught in the crossfire and killed. Faced with overwhelming odds, one of the Laconian flagships taking notice of them and notching another (semi)-failure, both are left to wonder whether their fight is winnable at all. Then Bobbie finds antimatter in the supplies taken from the Laconian freighter, a power source for its magnetic weapon and hatches a plan to kill the flagship.

On Laconia, Teresa Duarte, the fourteen-year-old daughter of Winston, learns that her father wants to train her to be the next high consul despite his quest for immortality and talks with Holden about his status in Duarte’s court. She also sneaks away to talk with a man she met in a mountain cave, whom she calls “Timothy”. Naomi mingles with the crew of the ship she rides on to avoid discovery by a Laconian political officer and is saved by the chief engineer who knows her from the events of Babylon’s Ashes—until their travel is cut short by a warning from the ring gates. The Laconian experiment, witnessed by Fayez and Elvi (who tried to stop it, to little avail) causes the neutron star to collapse into a black hole and emit a gamma-ray burst, lighting up the slow zone and destroying two of the ring gates. Duarte tells Teresa that they plan to send another antimatter ship but before the attack can be carried out, the aliens make their own attack: everyone across the connected systems experiences ‘lost time’ where they can see the spaces between subatomic particles; Elvi and Fayez are wounded and several of their colleagues killed when parts of their ship vanish; Medina Station, the Laconian dreadnought
Typhoon and everything inside the ring space is annihilated in an instant; and Duarte, augmented by the protomolecule, becomes catatonic.

Bobbie and Alex make the decision to ask Naomi about their plan to attack the Laconian flagship, the Tempest. Holden recognizes that something is wrong on Laconia and speaks with Paolo Cortázar, the head scientist, who plans to kill Teresa rather than let her become immortal. With the death of Medina Station, Naomi travels to Auberon—one of the most prosperous ring worlds—and takes over the underground. Elvi lands on Laconia and is told of what happened to Duarte and that her assistance is needed in running the scientific endeavors there; at the same time, Holden attempts to tell them of Cortázar’s plot against Teresa. Teresa is worried over the state of her father and goes to visit “Timothy”, who is revealed to be Amos Burton, sent with a pocket nuclear weapon to try to rescue Holden. The Laconian security force finds the two of them and kills Amos, though when they return they cannot find his body. Elvi speaks at the science center with two children who died but were reconstructed by the repair drones native to Laconia.

Bobbie and Alex embark to kill the Tempest, using a bomb constructed from antimatter and a gap in its sensors caused by the Sol forces. Alex distracts the flagship with the Gathering Storm while Bobbie delivers the bomb but their ship is damaged and she is forced to throw the bomb at the Tempest directly, destroying it and sacrificing herself in the process. Elvi tells Teresa, further traumatized by Amos’ death, of Cortázar’s plot and she tells her father. Naomi and Alex return, independently, to the Rocinante, which had been stashed on Freehold, the colony they returned to at the end of Persepolis Rising. Another lost-time attack occurs and Elvi thinks that such attacks are what shut down the consciousness of the protomolecule builders; humanity is more resilient and only loses a few minutes of time, but now the aliens are experimenting with more effective methods that work for longer. Naomi summons ships from the other ring worlds for an attack on Laconia’s shipyards.

Four hundred ships attack Laconia, drawing out the last flagship away from the planet so that a small strike force can destroy the shipyards. Duarte, though still comatose, awakens when he is scanned and kills Cortázar. Teresa decides she needs to leave Laconia, uses Amos' evacuation beacon as a call for her rescue and takes Holden from the cells as a bargaining card. Elvi realizes that Holden was the one who convinced Cortázar to kill Teresa but he tells her that it was a plan to betray Cortázar and install Elvi as the head scientist of Laconia. Naomi and Alex’s plan succeeds and they kill the shipyards, then descend to Laconia, following the evacuation signal. Laconian security forces catch up with Holden and Teresa but are killed by Amos, put back together by the repair drones. The crew of the Rocinante reunite and Teresa, as the daughter of the high consul, talks the remaining flagship down from killing them. On the ship, Amos tells Holden that the aliens that killed the protomolecule builders now plan to kill all of humanity.

Characters 
Main characters in the book include many from earlier in the series, including James Holden, Naomi Nagata, Bobbie Draper, Alex Kamal, Elvi Okoye, and Winston Duarte. The book introduces Duarte's 14-year-old daughter, Teresa, who is being trained as his successor. This is the only book in the series where Holden is not the protagonist, having only chapters in the prologue, epilogue and an interlude.

References

External links
 
 Review by Michael Pea on The Expanse Lives
 Review by Erin S. Bales on Speculative Chic

2019 American novels
American science fiction novels
Novels by James S. A. Corey
Space opera novels
The Expanse
Orbit Books books